Charleston is a ghost town in Elko County, Nevada, United States. It lies along the Bruneau River just south of the Mountain City and Jarbidge Ranger Districts of the Humboldt-Toiyabe National Forest and is near the southwest edge of the Jarbidge Wilderness.

History
The Charleston settlement was established in 1876 when gold was discovered in Seventy-Six Creek, at the southwestern base of Copper Mountain. The camp was originally called Mardis, but was soon named Charleston after a local prospector, Tom Charles. The settlement grew quickly, with the building of a hotel, saloons, schools, stores and an icehouse. By 1884, most mining operations had stopped.

A post office was established at Charleston in 1895, and remained in operation until 1951.

The camp revived in 1905, when the local mines started producing again. A five-stamp mill was built at the time. Another re-opening of the mines occurred during the period 1932 to 1937. The mines are now abandoned and the two remaining builds from the settlement are on private property.

See also
 List of ghost towns in Nevada

References

External links
+

Ghost towns in Nevada
Ghost towns in Elko County, Nevada